The Louisiana Tech Bulldogs college basketball team competes in the National Collegiate Athletic Association's (NCAA) Division I, representing Louisiana Tech University in Conference USA. Louisiana Tech has played its home games at the Thomas Assembly Center in Ruston, Louisiana since its opening in 1982.

Seasons

References

Louisiana Tech Bulldogs
Louisiana Tech Bulldogs basketball seasons